Ypthima asterope, the African ringlet or common three-ring, is a species of Satyrinae butterfly found in most dry areas of Africa and Asia.

The wingspan is 30–34 mm in males and 32–38 mm in females. Adults are on wing year round with peaks in summer and autumn in southern Africa. There is one generation per year.

The larvae feed on grasses (Poaceae). Larvae have been reared on Ehrharta erecta.

Subspecies
The species may be divided into the following subspecies:
Ypthima asterope asterope (Arabia, Turkey, northern tropical Africa)
Ypthima asterope mahratta Moore, 1884 (India)
Ypthima asterope hereroica van Son, 1955 (southern Africa, Namibia)

References

asterope
Butterflies of Africa
Butterflies of Asia
Insects of the Middle East
Butterflies described in 1832
Taxa named by Johann Christoph Friedrich Klug